Kerrie Agnes Biddell (8 February 19475 September 2014) was an Australian jazz and session singer, as well as a pianist and vocal teacher.

Life and Career
Born in Kings Cross, New South Wales, the only child of Irish-Catholic parents Kathleen, a jazz pianist and Dan, a solicitors clerk who also played piano. Biddell was sent to St Vincent's Convent in Potts Point at the age of six, soon after her father left her mother. In 1962, Biddell suffered a collapsed lung and rheumatoid arthritis, the latter of which affected her piano playing. She decided to become a singer, and, in 1967, sang for Dusty Springfield on backing vocals. Impressed, Springfield suggested she become a lead singer.

1960s
Biddell joined the local band The Echoes, and in 1968, The Affair.  Affair guitarist Jim Kelly called Biddell "a world-class vocalist". With her voice, the group could do various musical styles, such as Aretha Franklin-type soul, Sly Stone funk, and Jimmy Webb compositions. In 1969, the national competition Hoadley's Battle of the Sounds added a vocal-group category to its main pop/rock category. Kelly stated that The Affair was not a vocal group, but Biddell "rehearsed us till we were". The group won the category, with its prize being a trip to London, where the group relocated in mid-1970, only to disband months later. Before disbanding, they recorded Sly and the Family Stone's "Sing a Simple Song", which would become one of Biddell's signature songs.

1970s-2001
Biddell returned to Australia in 1970, where she toured with the Daly-Wilson Big Band, which performed swing music, in between her stint with Wilson, she also did tours with Dudley Moore, Cilla Black and Buddy Rich In 1972, she married David Glyde, a former alto saxophonist for Sounds Incorporated, who opened for The Beatles on tour. Glyde had contacts in Canada, and he and Biddell moved there. Her career as a session singer began soon after. She and her husband toured in the United States, including clubs in Las Vegas. She was offered a three-year six-figure USD contract with the MGM Grand Hotel and Casino, and, despite being desperate to be a star, she discovered she did not care for the business side of Vegas. "I started to see that the amount they wanted to take away from me was too much," she stated, and moved back to Australia in 1972, enrolling in the Sydney Conservatorium of Music.

She and Glyde divorced in 1977. She sang on hundreds of jingles, television shows and film scores, including the theme from series Sons and Daughters In 1983, she joined the faculty of the Jazz Diploma course at the Conservatorium, where she periodically taught into her later years. In 1992, she wrote a one-woman show, Legends, which later included June Bronhill, Lorrae Desmond, Toni Lamond, and Jeanne Little. In 2001, due to poor health, she retired from performing, but continued her teaching career.

Death
On 4 September 2014, Biddell died from a stroke. She was 67.

Discography

Studio albums

Awards

Mo Awards
The Australian Entertainment Mo Awards (commonly known informally as the Mo Awards), were annual Australian entertainment industry awards. They recognise achievements in live entertainment in Australia from 1975 to 2016. Kerrie Biddell won three awards in that time.
 (wins only)
|-
| 1989 
| Kerrie Biddell
| Jazz Vocal Performer of the Year
| 
|-
| 1993 
| Kerrie Biddell
| Jazz Vocal Performer of the Year
| 
|-
| 1995 
| Kerrie Biddell
| Jazz Vocal Performer of the Year
| 
|-

References

External links
 
 
 Profile at the University of Sydney
 http://www.talking-shellac.com/subpages/kerrie-biddell.htm (Kerrie Biddell Tribute page)

1947 births
2014 deaths
Australian jazz singers
Sydney Conservatorium of Music alumni
Academic staff of the Sydney Conservatorium of Music
20th-century Australian women singers
21st-century Australian women singers
Women music educators
The Affair (band) members
Daly-Wilson Big Band members